The N'Djamena Grand Mosque is a mosque in N'Djamena, Chad.

Architecture
The mosque complex consist of libraries, lecture halls and schools!

See also
 Islam in Chad

References

Buildings and structures in N'Djamena
Islam in Chad
Mosques in Africa